The 1953–54 Copa México was the 39th edition of the Copa México and the 12th staging of the tournament in the professional era.

The competition started on 20 March 1954 and concluded on 12 May 1954 with the Final, held at the Estadio Olímpico de la Ciudad de los Deportes in Mexico City, in which América defeated Guadalajara 3–2 in penalties to win the first cup title in the professional era for the club.

Group stage

Group A
<onlyinclude>

Group B
<onlyinclude>

Group C
<onlyinclude>

Final stage
<onlyinclude>

Playoff

Top scorers

References

Copa MX
1953–54 in Mexican football
1953–54 domestic association football cups